Oriental City was a major shopping centre in Colindale, North London, England, originally built as a luxury Japanese shopping centre called Yaohan Plaza by the Yaohan retail company of Japan. After Yaohan filed for bankruptcy in 1997, the centre became a lower-end mall specialising in various oriental foods and items, while also containing health and social services for the East Asian community. Opening in 1993, the 141,000 sq ft complex was located at 399 Edgware Road with a dedicated car park and two floors.

As Yaohan Plaza, the shopping centre played a short but significant role in promoting Japanese cuisine and culture in London. Later, as Oriental City, it was referred to as London's "real Chinatown". Oriental City received about 10,000 visitors weekly as of 2006. The complex was closed for redevelopment on 1 June 2008 and, after several changes of ownership, was demolished in August 2014. In July 2017 the smaller Bang Bang Oriental Food Hall opened on the site, comprising 32 food kiosks, massage and beauty therapy suites as well as shops and a cultural centre.

Yaohan Plaza

Background 
During the rapid growth of the Japanese economy in the 1980s, many Japanese businesses established operations and partnerships in the UK. Honda formed a partnership with British Leyland in 1979 and Nissan opened its first European factory in Derby in 1986. Such activities caused a significant increase in Japanese living in the UK. This renaissance of Anglo-Japanese exchange culminated in Japan Festival 1991, a four-month festival celebrated across the UK with both traditional Japanese arts such as kabuki and noh as well as contemporary Japanese rock. At this time, Japanese department store Yaohan began plans to open a large shopping centre in London.

Yaohan estimated that over 40,000 Japanese lived in the vicinity of the planned shopping centre, and further cited the 1991 Japan Festival as evidence of growing interest in Japan. They planned the shopping centre with the dual-aim to serve the large Japanese community and introduce Europeans to Japanese food and culture. Yaohan was in the process of pursuing a plan of overseas expansion and had already established operations in Hong Kong, Singapore and the United States.

Opening 
Yaohan invested £50 million (£87 million in 2021) in the construction of a Japanese-themed department store in Colindale with 10,134 square metres of space dedicated to retail, additional office space and parking for 800 cars. The building would combine a modern shopping centre with traditional Japanese architectural elements such as a tile roof. The interior would do the same, and featured traditional Japanese facades on many of the shops, similar to the Edo-Koji shopping area at Tokyo International Airport.  Yaohan Plaza, London opened as a high-end Japanese shopping centre on 28 August 1993 with the slogan: "All Japan under one roof." Chindon'ya performers from the Chin-don Tsushinsha group were flown in from Japan to promote the opening.

Yaohan Plaza featured a grand entry hall with a wooden frame supporting a large ceremonial banner and knot, covered by a traditional tile roof. The north wing was a single storey and housed the full-size Japanese supermarket and food court. The south wing was two stories and housed shops and restaurants. At the back was a multi-storey car park. In total, Yaohan had 15 directly-owned retail operations, 47 third-party stores and 11 restaurants. The supermarket sold a wide range of Japanese foods including a full range of Japanese dry goods, freshly made sushi and obento, fish, and Japanese-style meats for the purpose of dishes like yakiniku and shabu shabu. Fresh fruit was flown in from Japan, and a Japanese-style bakery was operated on site. Yaohan Plaza's supermarket offered over 70 varieties of sake and 40 kinds of miso. Prices were considered high relative to Japan due to import costs, but 10-20 percent lower than smaller Japanese shops in central London. The New York Times reported in 1993 that a 1.5 litre bottle of cold Japanese tea cost £4.99 (£8.69 in 2021). Yaohan's sushi kitchen operated 24 hours a day and supplied Waitrose, Selfridges, and Harvey Nichols.

The shopping centre had both full-service restaurants such as a sushi bar, izakaya, okonomiyaki restaurant ('Abeno') and ramen bar ('Ramen Seto'), a cafe, as well as a food court offering bento, kushiyaki, donburi such as unatamadon noodles and other Japanese foods. A wagashi-ya also operated at Yaohan and Minamoto Kitchoan used Yaohan Plaza to establish its formal London presence in 1996. A couple that had moved to London from the craft town of Mino, Gifu operated the shop 'Utsuwa no Yakata', which sold Japanese porcelain and tablewares. The main hall hosted fairs where additional special import products such as antiques were sometimes sold. The space also hosted car sales and displays of Japanese culture such as kimono.

One notable feature of Yaohan was its SegaDome arcade, themed to be like a small version of SegaWorld. A large Sonic the Hedgehog graphic adorned the outside of the building.

Other Japanese-focussed shops included a bookshop, Asahiya Shoten, with a large selection of manga, a video store, an imported toy and video game shop, a Sanrio shop and an electronics retailer. Services included a hairdresser specialising in Asian hair, a travel agency, an estate agent, a cram school and a dental practice. Additional shops in Yaohan Plaza focussed on selling British and European luxury goods to Japanese tourists. Liberty of London operated one such shop. Miyuki Hazzard, Yaohan Plaza London's publicity manager reported that 70% of customers were Japanese. Yaohan negotiated with a local taxi service to provide Japanese-language service and female drivers to put shoppers at ease, many of whom were housewives. Yaohan Plaza was actively promoted in the Japanese-language edition of British Airways's in-flight magazine.

Yaohan Plaza employed 190 staff, and each were expected to participate in a morning rituals typical of a Japanese company, including singing the company song.

The opening of Yaohan Plaza attracted some media attention in Britain, and several journalists described their experiences at the shopping centre. Monique Roffey of the Independent described it as a "hypermarket cum shopping mall cum cultural space-capsule".

Demise 
By 1995, Yaohan had encountered problems with their business plan. A report in the Independent newspaper suggested that younger Japanese, who were a growing demographic in Britain's Japanese community, were more cosmopolitan and less likely to require a Japanese-tailored shopping experience. This younger demographic also had reduced spending power, particularly during a time of recession, and were unwilling to spend the premium for imported goods. Complaints included that expensive imported food would go on to the shelf already past its sell-by date. Thus, Yaohan began to change direction and renamed the shopping centre Oriental City. The focus would gradually shift away from Japanese clientele towards Chinese, Korean, Vietnamese and Malaysian communities. Many Japanese shops and restaurants were replaced and British Chinese became the largest group of customers.

Furthermore, Yaohan company's heavy focus on expanding across Asia left it vulnerable to the 1997 Asian Financial Crisis, and the company filed for bankruptcy that year. As a result, the London shopping centre was sold in October 1997 to new Malaysian owners, furthering the move away from a Japanese focus.

Legacy 
Yaohan Plaza had a significant impact on the Japanese cuisine and cultural scene in London. Individuals and businesses involved in Yaohan Plaza continued after the Plaza's demise. Yaohan's Miyuki Hazzard went on to serve as a director for the newly founded Japanese-inspired British fast-food chain itsu, which opened in 1997. The owners of the okonomiyaki shop 'Abeno' re-opened in central London and were eventually awarded a Michelin star. Many other Japanese restaurants founded at Yaohan Plaza spread across London and remain today, including Ramen Seto. The couple that ran the homewares shop eventually founded their own Japanese tableware importer 'Doki'. Minamoto Kitchoan opened a flagship location on Piccadilly in 1997 and have maintained a presence in London ever since.

Yaohan Plaza may be considered ahead of its time, as demand for Japanese cuisine in the UK continued to grow in the 2000s and 2010s. By 2018, Yaohan Plaza's competitor Japan Centre had created their own large food hall in London, Ichiba, along with a chain of restaurants.

Oriental City 

Oriental City saw some of the more expensive to maintain Japanese architectural elements were removed or neglected. The grand entrance to the main hall was removed and replaced by two Chinese guardian lions. The Japanese garden was no longer maintained. Elements of the exterior which were previously painted in a natural wood tone were repainted yellow. Many Japanese elements were also stripped from the interior, however most stalls in the food court maintained their distinctly Japanese facades despite serving other cuisines.

After the centre was bought by Malaysian owners, it contained a large oriental supermarket, now relocated to Bayswater, and a food court with a range of foods from different areas of South-East Asia; stalls offered Malaysian, Thai, Vietnamese, Chinese, Korean and Japanese foods including bento boxes and sushi, ramen noodles, and assorted Asian desserts. The food court was immensely popular with surrounding office workers and the North London community; and often became very crowded at weekends.

The food court was complemented by a number of oriental restaurants in the complex, with the majority of them located on the upper floor. The complex contained two Dim Sum restaurants, a Sichuan restaurant, and an 'all you can eat' restaurant. Outside, there was a durian stall and a satay stall.

Aside from the food outlets, the complex also contained a number of small shops and stalls. Over its history there was a high turnover of shops, with only one remaining original tenant in the facility, the Japanese tableware store, Utsuwa-No-Yataka. Most original tenants had left by 2003. In the period shortly before the centre closed down, shoppers could find a tailor's shop, a jeweller, a hairdresser, a beauty shop, Chinese medicine shops, a martial arts store, a large furniture store, and visit the Sega Park arcade.

The centre was a focal point for the Oriental community, often hosting weeks which promoted the cultural identity of different South East Asian countries. These events typically consisted of various performing arts, and the promotion of that country's particular cuisine.

Proposed redevelopment and closure

In November 2006, Oriental City was bought out by the developer Development Securities who planned to demolish the centre and replace it with a B&Q, a housing development and a primary school. This private business transaction was beset by delays from store owners, the East Asian community, petitions, and even interference by the Chinese Consul-General and an ex-Arsenal football player.  The developer was not able to close the complex until 2008, by which time the Great Recession had soured their ability to proceed with the redevelopment.

In 2006, the developers stated that there would be provisions for the current tenants of Oriental City to continue in the new development; however, the tenants objected to this, owing to the lack of consultation. Tenants stated that the new complex would take up to 9 years to complete, contrary to Development Securities' claim that redevelopment would take 3 years.  Most tenants did not believe they could survive even a temporary relocation of their businesses.

Aside from business considerations, the East Asian community feared any redevelopment would mean the loss of an important community focal point.  The tenants shut their businesses for a day to protest to the council at Brent Town Hall on 21 November 2006 feeling that they had been treated like 'second class citizens'. The tenants' plight was backed by a long-time visitor of the Centre, ex-Arsenal football player Ian Wright, who met the then London Mayor Ken Livingstone's planning officials in early December 2006 to object to the redevelopment plans.

In February 2007, the Chinese Consul-General wrote to London's mayor to express his "deep concern" about the project, calling for the proposal to be modified. Following a petition, it was announced that Oriental City would remain open until at least May 2008. The centre closed permanently at 7:00 pm on Sunday 1 June 2008, with thousands of people flocking to see Oriental City for the last time on its final day.

On 31 July 2008 Development Securities sold the site to a new developer, B & S Homes, for £68 million. The purchasers paid a £16 million deposit but were unable to find the £52 million required to complete their purchase. Their deposit was lost, the building went back into the hands of Development Securities, and further progress in the prevailing economic climate looked unlikely. As a result, the building remained boarded up and derelict.

From early 2009, there was much talk amongst former tenants of a proposal to reopen the doors of Oriental City in its previous form later that year. Discussions were understood to be taking place between the owners and former tenants. In February 2010, former tenants of Oriental City held a protest at the site over the continued closure of the centre. A campaign to re-open the centre was initiated, and it was reported that Morrisons was interested in developing the site.

In May 2013, planning permission was granted for a full redevelopment of the site by Development Securities with Morrisons as an anchor tenant. In August 2014 the Oriental City building was demolished, and a new development including flats and a Morrisons Superstore was built on the location, the store opening in March 2016. Brent Council reserved the remaining part of the retail site for "Far Eastern and Oriental uses" only, incorporating 30,000 sq ft of restaurant space. This was later allocated to the Bang Bang Oriental Food Hall.

In TV and film
The centre was used as an abandoned mall in the BBC One series Luther.  It appeared in the 2012 film Dredd, where it was restored to a semblance of its former glory with a Blade Runner-like makeover.  It was used in the first episode of the 2011 BBC Three series The Fades.
Oriental City was the single location used for the 2012 TV film of a Royal Shakespeare Company production of Julius Caesar, directed by Gregory Doran. The complex appeared in 2013 during a first season episode of the BBC Two series Charlie Brooker's Weekly Wipe, with Brooker wandering around various parts of the derelict car park, Zen Tian Di Chinese buffet and a set of escalators. The centre was also used for the music video Bittersweet Memories by Welsh metalcore band Bullet For My Valentine.

See also

 Japanese community of London
 Chinatown
 Wing Yip
 British Chinese

References

External links

 Video of Oriental City Food Court taken 25.05.08
 Flickr group for photos and videos of Oriental City
 Route79's Flickr pictures of Oriental City
 'Oriental City Agreement Reached', dimsum.co.uk
 'Oriental City protest', dimsum.co.uk
 "Anger over continued closure of 'real Chinatown'" BBC article, February 2010
 "End of the road for 'real Chinatown'?", BBC article
 London Randomness Guide to Oriental City
 Campaign & petition to re-open Oriental City
 https://web.archive.org/web/20110216090458/http://www.yell.com/reviews/oriental+city+supermarket-1g16x8a-r

Shopping centres in the London Borough of Brent
Former buildings and structures in the London Borough of Brent
Demolished buildings and structures in London
Buildings and structures demolished in 2014
Defunct shopping malls
Asian diaspora in the United Kingdom